Assignment K is a 1968 British spy thriller film directed by Val Guest in Techniscope and starring Stephen Boyd, Camilla Sparv, Michael Redgrave, Leo McKern, Robert Hoffmann and Jeremy Kemp. The film was based on the 1964 novel Department K by Hartley Howard.

Plot
A British spy has his cover blown, leading to the East German Stasi kidnapping his girlfriend to try to extract information about his double agents' activities.

Cast
 Stephen Boyd as Philip Scott
 Camilla Sparv as Toni Peters
 Michael Redgrave as Harris
 Leo McKern as Smith
 Robert Hoffmann as Paul Spiegler
 Jeremy Kemp as Hal
 Jane Merrow as Martine
 Carl Möhner as Inspector (as Carl Moehner)
 Vivi Bach as Erika Herschel
 Werner Peters as Kramer
 Dieter Geissler as Kurt
 John Alderton as George
 Jan Werich as Dr. Spiegler
 David Healy as David
 Ursula Howells as Estelle
 Basil Dignam as Howlett
 Geoffrey Bayldon as The Boffin
 Joachim Hansen as Heinrich Herschel

See also
 List of British films of 1968

References

External links
 
 
 

1968 films
1960s thriller drama films
1960s spy thriller films
British thriller drama films
British spy thriller films
Cold War spy films
1960s English-language films
Films directed by Val Guest
Films based on British novels
Columbia Pictures films
Films set in Munich
Films set in London
Films set in Austria
Films shot in London
1968 drama films
1960s British films